Lorenzo Dechalus (born September 17, 1968), known professionally as Lord Jamar is an American rapper, DJ, record producer, actor and podcaster. He is a founding member of the hip hop group Brand Nubian, which was formed in 1989. In 1996, he discovered Dead Prez and got them signed to Loud Records.

Early life
Jamar was born in The Bronx, New York City, but was raised in New Rochelle, New York. Jamar has Afro-Guyanese heritage on his father's side, and he is the eldest of three brothers.  He was introduced to hip hop music in the 1970s through a friend who lived in his neighborhood, and he would listen to tapes of The Cold Crush Brothers, Grandmaster Flash and the Furious Five and The Sugarhill Gang. DJ Daryll C of Crash Crew used to take Jamar to hip hop shows in New York City. Jamar sold crack cocaine during his teen years, but stopped after people he knew received sealed indictments. He dropped out of high school after failing ninth grade, and worked a few short-term jobs prior to signing a record deal.

Career
Brand Nubian's debut studio album, One for All, was released in 1990 and is regarded as one of the greatest hip hop albums released during that time.

Brand Nubian's third studio album, Everything is Everything was released in 1994. In 1996, he discovered Dead Prez and got them signed to Loud Records. As an actor, Jamar is best known for his role of Supreme Allah on the TV series Oz. He has appeared on Law & Order: Special Victims Unit, Third Watch, and The Sopranos. He has also worked as a producer for artists such as Dead Prez, Buckshot, Shaka Amazulu the 7th and Tom Browne.

He released his debut solo album The 5% Album (an album dedicated to the Nation of Gods and Earths) on June 27, 2006. Like his onscreen character on Oz, Jamar is a member of the Nation of Gods and Earths.

Jamar currently co-hosts a podcast, Yanadameen Godcast, with fellow rapper Rah Digga. He has criticized Black Lives Matter, saying, "It's not our movement," and that, in regard to the George Floyd protests, "most people looting are white; some riots are staged by paid agitators."

Controversy
Jamar garnered controversy after releasing a diss track directed at Kanye West on February 4, 2013 titled "Lift Up Your Skirt," and stated that "gay has no place in hip-hop", which led to him being characterized by some in the media as homophobic. Jamar denied the homophobia accusations by tweeting that he "went to a gay wedding of a good friend not long ago".

In a September 2013 interview on VladTV, Jamar declared that white rappers were "guests in hip hop". Eminem responded to Jamar with the track "Fall" from his 2018 album Kamikaze. Jamar responded to Eminem on his podcast.

In July 2020, Jamar denounced the Black Lives Matter movement in a video posted to his Twitter account by the music account SCUM, saying, "Black Lives Matter is a movement that was given to us by George Soros and his fucking boys because they saw how things were going and they didn't want it to go back to the 60s."

In December 2020, Jamar denied the death of six million Jews in the Holocaust, stating that at most 500,000 died, and claiming that six million Jews were not even present in Europe at the time.

Discography

Studio albums

 The 5% Album (2006)

Guest appearances

Filmography

Film

Television

Documentary

References

External links

1968 births
African-American male actors
African-American male rappers
African-American record producers
American hip hop record producers
American Holocaust deniers
American people of Guyanese descent
Critics of Black Lives Matter
Place of birth missing (living people)
American male television actors
Living people
Five percenters
Musicians from New Rochelle, New York
Rappers from New York (state)
Indie rappers
21st-century American rappers
Record producers from New York (state)
21st-century American male musicians
21st-century African-American musicians
20th-century African-American people
American people of Jamaican descent